Philip Andrew Orr (born 14 December 1950) is a former Irish international and British and Irish Lions Rugby Union loosehead prop.

Orr was born in Dublin.  Educated at The High School, Dublin and Trinity College Dublin, he played for Old Wesley for over 20 years and was, for many years, his country's most-capped prop with a then world record 58 appearances. Orr made his debut against France in 1976 and was part of the Irish teams that won a Triple Crown in 1982 and 1985. He toured with the Lions to New Zealand in 1977, winning one cap, and was a replacement during the tour of South Africa in 1980. However, Orr was not available for the 1983 tour to the same country due to business reasons. He retired from international rugby in 1987, having played for Ireland in the inaugural rugby world cup.

In 1991, Orr was president of Old Wesley in its centenary year. In 2009, he was elected to the Irish Rugby Football Union Committee, and was the president of the organisation between 14 July 2017 and 13 July 2018.

References

1950 births
Living people
Irish rugby union players
Ireland international rugby union players
British & Irish Lions rugby union players from Ireland
Old Wesley players
Rugby union props
People educated at The High School, Dublin